Still Run may refer to:

 Still Run (Maurice River tributary), New Jersey, United States
 Still Run (album), an album by Wet